Carbios is a French company in the field of biochemistry. It holds a number of worldwide patents. Among other things Carbios has invented an industrial application of enzymes renders plastic waste compostable. The company resides in the French science park Biopôle Clermont-Limagne, close to Saint-Beauzire, Puy-de-Dôme in the Auvergne. One of their partners is the INSA Toulouse (National Institute for Applied Sciences).

History 
Carbios was founded in 2011. Since 2013 it is listed at the stock index Euronext Growth, a subsidiary of Euronext.

On January 19, 2019, Carbios announced a partnership with Toulouse White Biotechnology (TWB) as a new investor.

In April 2020 Carbios gained attention due to an article in Nature which explained how a hydrolase enzyme designed by Carbios enabled to recycle 90% of all PET plastic waste within 10 hours. In the following a number of big companies including PepsiCo and Nestle became partners.

Main Stockholders

Structure    
Carbios runs three departments, all based on their application of enzymes:
General biodegradation
Depolymerization of plastic waste
Biotechnology for the production of plastic from biological ingredients such as lactic acid.

In order to pursue the further development concerning biodegradation, Carbios has founded the subsidiary Carbiolice, which is a joint-venture with Limagrain and Novozymes.

References

External links
 Biopôle Clermont-Limagne Technology park for life sciences

Biotechnology companies of France
Biotechnology companies established in 2011
Chemical companies of France
Chemical companies established in 2011
French brands